Kvarteret Skatan is a Swedish comedy series consisting of short sketches based on different characters that appears in each episode. The series was broadcast on SVT for three seasons between 2003 and 2006. And has turned into dinner shows and a film which premiered 16 March 2012 called Kvarteret Skatan travels to Laholm.

References

2000s Swedish television series
2003 Swedish television series debuts
2006 Swedish television series endings
Television shows set in Stockholm
Swedish-language television shows